Acrobasis comptella is a species of snout moth in the genus Acrobasis. It was described by Émile Louis Ragonot in 1887, and is known from the western United States.

The larvae feed on Quercus dumosa, Quercus douglasii, Quercus garryana, Quercus ajoensis and Chrysolepis sempervirens.

References

Moths described in 1887
Acrobasis
Moths of North America